Cathleen Calbert is an American poet and writer, author of five poetry collections.  Her writing has appeared in Ms. Magazine, The Nation, The New Republic, The New York Times, The Paris Review, Poetry, Ploughshares, and elsewhere.  She was born in Jackson, Michigan and raised in southern California. She received her B.A. from the University of California at Berkeley, her M.A. from Syracuse University, and her Ph.D. from the University of Houston. Currently, she is a professor of English at Rhode Island College.

Published works
Books
 The Afflicted Girls (Little Red Tree Publishing, 2016)
 Sleeping with a Famous Poet (C.W. Books, 2007)
 Bad Judgment (Sarabande Books, 1999)
 Lessons in Space (University Press of Florida, 1997)

Chapbooks
 The Ten Worst Human Fears (Rooster Hill Press, 2012)
 Death Poems (Premier Poets, 2005)
 My Summer as a Bride (Riverstone, 1995)

Awards and honors
 "The Nation" Discovery Award
 Pushcart Prize
 Gordon Barber Memorial Award, Poetry Society of America
 Sheila Motton Book Award, New England Poetry Club

References

Sources
 Amazon author page
 Cathleen Calbert's Web Page
 C.W. Books
 Sarabande Books

University of California, Berkeley alumni
University of Houston alumni
Syracuse University alumni
Living people
Poets from Michigan
Poets from Connecticut
American women journalists
American women poets
Year of birth missing (living people)
People from Jackson, Michigan
Rhode Island College faculty
American women academics
21st-century American women